Alger républicain (Republican Algeria, الجزائر الجمهورية) is an Arabic language Algerian newspaper published in Algeria.

History and profile
Alger républicain was founded in October 1938, and intermittently published ever since. In its initial phase the paper declared itself as "the honest newspaper of the honest people". It is close to the Algerian communist movement, without having been an official party publication. However, the movement controlled the paper in the past.

The paper was edited by the French-Algerian communist and anti-colonial activist Henri Alleg from 1951, as a major daily newspaper. Despite censorship and confiscation of copies by the French authorities, it had become perhaps the largest daily in Algeria at independence in 1962, having featured a number of prominent writers and journalists, including Albert Camus and Kateb Yacine. Alger républicain was banned in 1965 by the government of Houari Boumédiène, but later refounded by Alleg and others in exile. In 1994, it ceased regular publication, but has since returned under Alleg's editorship, and is now on sale in Algeria again.

Notable journalists
Ali Dilem
Fodil Mezali
Kateb Yacine
Mohamed Benchicou
Mohamed Hassaïne
Saïd Mekbel

References

1938 establishments in Algeria
Newspapers published in Algeria
Arabic-language newspapers
Newspapers established in 1938
Arabic communist newspapers